Remigio Alejandro Valenzuela Buelna, known as Remmy Valenzuela (born 2 October 1990), is a Mexican singer, songwriter and accordionist. He was nominated for the "New Artist of the Year" at the Latin American Music Awards of 2015 and his album Mi Vida en Vida was nominated for the Best Norteño Album at the Latin Grammy Awards of 2015.

Life
Born in Sinaloa state, he started off as a drummer but switched to the accordion at the age of 13. His initial successes were with narcocorridos, but started gaining mass popularity with romantic songs like Te tocó perder. Eventually, he signed with Fonovisa. In 2015, he released his album Mi princesa, of which the single ¿Por qué me ilusionaste? was mentioned as one of the "Best Songs of 2015" by Ben Ratliff of the New York Times.

By the age of 22, he is reported to have "foiled death twice", once after a car crash, and the second time at a shootout between government forces and an organised crime syndicate during a performance in the Nayarit state of Mexico. In Sinaloa state in 2015, he was arrested for illegal possession of a firearm. He was released on bail after two days.

References

1990 births
Living people
Mexican male singer-songwriters
Mexican singer-songwriters
Musicians from Sinaloa
Norteño musicians
Fonovisa Records artists
21st-century Mexican singers
21st-century Mexican male singers